Marty Callner (born 1950 in Cincinnati, Ohio) is an American television director, who has made music videos, comedy specials, concert specials, and television shows, in a career spanning from 1977 to present day. He is the creator of HBO's Hard Knocks and has been nominated and won numerous Primetime Emmy Awards, Directors Guild of America Awards, CableACE Awards and MTV Video Music Awards.

Work
Callner's directorial credits on music videos include videos for Aerosmith, Bon Jovi, Chaka Khan, Cher, Diana Ross, Stevie Nicks, Heart, Kiss, Poison, Ratt, The Cranberries, Scorpions, Twisted Sister, Whitesnake and ZZ Top.

His music video specials include Bette Midler's Diva Las Vegas, Pat Benatar's In Concert, Britney Spears: Live from Las Vegas, Diana Ross Live at Caesar's Palace, Fleetwood Mac's Mirage Tour, Garth Brooks Live from Central Park, Gladys Knight Live at the Greek Theatre, Gloria Estefan's Caribbean Soul: The Atlantis Concert, Justin Timberlake's FutureSex/LoveShow, Marc Anthony's Concert from Madison Square Garden, Paul Simon Live at the Tower Theatre, Rolling Stones' Four Flicks, Stevie Nicks's Bella Donna, and Whitney Houston's Whitney: The Concert for a New South Africa.

He has also directed recordings of performances by comedians including Pee-wee Herman, Sam Kinison, George Carlin, Robin Williams, Whoopi Goldberg, Dane Cook, John Leguizamo, Billy Crystal, George Lopez, Jerry Seinfeld, Chris Rock, Whitney Cummings, and Will Ferrell.

Awards and nominations

References

External links
Official website

1950 births
Living people
American music video directors
Artists from Cincinnati
Woodward High School (Cincinnati, Ohio) alumni